Nampalli or Nampally may refer to:

 Nampally, Hyderabad
 Nampally, Nalgonda
 Hyderabad Deccan (Railway station), popularly known as Nampally Railway Station.